Uzi Tayou (born April 28, 1989) is a Cameroonian footballer who currently plays for the Empire Strykers of the Major Arena Soccer League. Tayou won the MASL Championship with the Baltimore Blast in 2016.

During his career in the league, Tayou has played for the Las Vegas Legends, Baltimore Blast, Soles de Sonora, and Monterrey Flash, and Empire Strykers (formerly the Ontario Fury), and reached the MASL Ron Newman Cup Finals with three different teams. He has earned accolades including being named to the All-Star Game, Defensive Player of the Year, and a league leader in blocked shots. 

In 2022, Tayou will once again represent Team USA with the United States National Arena Soccer Team in international competitions, including the WMF World Cup.

Tayou moved to from his native Cameroon to Las Vegas in 2006 and rose to prominence with a successful college soccer career at West Virginia University, which included two NCAA Tournaments. Tayou signed his first indoor professional contract with the MASL in 2012, and then his first outdoor professional contract in 2018, joining the Tulsa Roughnecks of the United Soccer League. In May 2021, Uzi and his brother Franck joined the Wichita Wings for the remainder of the Major Arena Soccer League 2 season.

He is the older brother of fellow professional soccer player and MASL MVP Franck Tayou.

For his ongoing work to help communities off the field, Tayou was awarded the Ed Tepper Humanitarian of the Year for the 2018-19 season. He also pioneered a health and fitness program for residents of National CORE affordable housing communities in the Inland Empire.

References

External links
 

1989 births
Living people
Cameroonian footballers
Association football defenders
West Virginia Mountaineers men's soccer players
Real Maryland F.C. players
Northern Virginia Royals players
NJ-LUSO Parma players
FC Wichita players
FC Tulsa players
Soccer players from Nevada
USL Championship players
Major Arena Soccer League players
Baltimore Blast players
Cameroonian emigrants to the United States
Sportspeople from Las Vegas
Monterrey Flash players
Ontario Fury players
Las Vegas Legends
Expatriate footballers in Mexico
Garden City Community College alumni
Professional Arena Soccer League players
National Premier Soccer League players
FC Golden State Force players